Wald is a municipality in the canton of Appenzell Ausserrhoden in Switzerland.

Geography

Of this area, 66% is used for agricultural purposes, while 28.4% is forested. Of the rest of the land, 5.4% is settled (buildings or roads) and the remainder (0.1%) is non-productive (rivers, glaciers or mountains).

Demographics
In 2008 about 10.1% were foreign nationals. Over the last 10 years the population has decreased at a rate of -6.3%. Most of the population speaks German (93.6%), with Serbo-Croatian being second most common (2.3%) and French being third (0.8%).

, the gender distribution of the population was 51.3% male and 48.7% female.  The age distribution, in Wald is; 94 people or 10.7% of the population are between 0–6 years old.  129 people or 14.6% are 6-15, and 50 people or 5.7% are 16-19.  Of the adult population, 46 people or 5.2% of the population are between 20–24 years old.  231 people or 26.2% are 25-44, and 200 people or 22.7% are 45-64.  The senior population distribution is 89 people or 10.1% of the population are between 65–79 years old, and  42 people or 4.8% are over 80.

In the 2007 federal election the FDP received 65.3% of the vote.

In Wald about 77.5% of the population (between age 25-64) have completed either non-mandatory upper secondary education or additional higher education (either university or a Fachhochschule).

Wald has an unemployment rate of 0.58%.  , there were 73 people employed in the primary economic sector and about 31 businesses involved in this sector.  133 people are employed in the secondary sector and there are 16 businesses in this sector.  88 people are employed in the tertiary sector, with 29 businesses in this sector.

The historical population is given in the following table:

References

Municipalities of Appenzell Ausserrhoden